The suling or seruling is a musical instrument of the Sundanese people in western Java, Indonesia. It is used in the Degung ensemble. Bamboo ring flute can also be found in Southeast Asian, especially in Brunei, Indonesia, Malaysia, the Philippines and Singapore.

Construction
Sulings are made mainly of "tamiang" bamboo (Schizostachyum blumei, Nees), a long, thin-walled bamboo tube. The mouthpiece of the suling is circled with a thin band made of rattan near a small hole.

Playing method

There are two factors that affect a fine suling's tone:
Fingering position.
Speed of the airflow blown by the mouth.

The fingering position changes the wavelength of sound resonance inside the suling's body. Depending on the distance of nearest hole to the suling's head, different notes can be produced. The airflow speed also can modify the tone's frequency. A note with twice frequency can be produced mostly by blowing the air into suling's head's hole with twice speed.

In the music of Bali the suling is an essential instrument and it appears to be similar to other forms of Javanese suling.  The way it is played, however, sets it apart from other forms of Indonesian suling. Namely, it is necessary for the performers to use the technique circular breathing in order to create a highly strung sense of constancy that continues even at moments of dramatic climax by the percussive gamelan instruments.

Special effects
Slur, is dynamically changing note from one tone position to another position without stopping the airflow. For example, changing from 5 to 4, 4 to 5, 2 to 1 etc.
Puruluk, (Sundanese term) is an effect produced by a-repeatedly-fast opening-and-closing of suling's hole by one or more fingers. The produced sound is similar to voice of a pigeon. The easiest puruluk can be produced by opening and closing mid-finger as shown by the following picture:

In Sundanese technique, there are other known effects such as wiwiw, keleter, lelol, gebos, petit, jengkat, and betrik.

Types

Sundanese

In the Sundanese region, a suling is used as
one of the main instruments in kacapi suling
accompanying instrument in Gamelan Degung, Tembang Sunda

Tuning
Sulings can have either 4 holes or 6 holes. The 6-holed Sundanese suling can play at least three different scales. Some custom sulings have 7 or 8 holes as additional holes for playing extended scales such as Mandalungan, the transposed version of Degung.
Pelog Degung: da mi na ti la da [1 2 3 4 5 1], nearly corresponds to do si sol fa mi do [1' 7 5 4 3 1] in the Western diatonic scale.
Madenda or Sorog: da mi na ti la da [1 2 3 4 5 1], nearly similar to fa mi do si la fa [4’ 3’ 1’ 7 6 4] in the Western diatonic scale. Madenda conceptually played by changing the 3rd note of Degung [1' 7 5 4 3 1] in diatonic scale to [1' 7 6 4 3 1], and move the Sundanese 1/da to the Western 4/fa position. 
Saléndro: da mi na ti la da [1 2 3 4 5 1], nearly similar to re do la sol fa re [2’ 1’ 6 5 4 2] in the Western diatonic scale. Salendo tone are almost five-equally divided tones, called as Saléndro Padantara (equal interval). Unequal division of Saléndro notes called as Saléndro Bédantara (unequal interval).

Mandalungan: a rarely used scale, similar to Degung scale, but it is actually a transposed Degung via changing the 4th tone of Madenda [4' 3' 1' 7 6 4] in Western diatonic scale to [4' 3' 1' ♭7 6 4]. Basically sounds the same as Degung, just with a different transposition. This scale needs an extra hole (usually in the back of suling) to play.

The following picture shows the fingering for a six-holed Sundanese suling.

And below is the example of 'more realistic' view of finger positioning for the pelog degung scale.

Famous Sundanese suling players
Endang Sukandar, 1996 2nd Winner of International Festival of Wind Instruments in Seoul, South Korea
Burhan Sukarma
Uking Sukri
Bang Saat(Additional player of Dewa Budjana, He came from kalimantan) He also called as "saat"
The Suling can be many sizes

Suling outside Indonesia
In Brunei, the suling today is played during a cultural festival and other events together with other Bruneian traditional instruments especially the Gulintangan. While in East Malaysia, especially in Sabah with a wide variety of aerophone, the instrument is played by all the interior ethnic groups in the state of Kadazan-Dusun, Murut, Rungus and Lun Bawang/Lundayeh. In Sarawak, the suling is mostly played by men in a Dayak people longhouse.

It is also called as suling by the Tausug, Yakan, B'laan, and Tiruray. Other names for the suling include the lantey (Ata), kinsi (Bukidnon), dagoyong (Higanon) and a babarak (Palawan)

The Maguindanaon suling is the smallest bamboo flute of the Maguindanaon and the only one classified as a ring-flute (the other two bamboo flutes of the Maguindanaon, the tumpong and the palendag are both lip-valley flutes). Air is passed through the suling via a blowing hole found at the bottom of the instrument and pitch is controlled via five finger holes on the top and one finger hole located on the bottom. Traditionally only the palendag was commonly played but because of the difficult nature of playing the palendag, both the tumpong and the suling have come to replace the palendag as the Maguindanaon’s most common aerophones.

See also

 Bamboo musical instruments
 Sundanese music

References 

Bamboo flutes
Bruneian musical instruments
Circular breathing
End-blown flutes
External fipple flutes
Indonesian musical instruments
Malaysian musical instruments
Music of Bali
Music of West Java
Panerusan instruments
Philippine musical instruments
Sundanese culture
Papua New Guinean musical instruments